The men's discus throw event at the 1952 Summer Olympics took place on 22 July at the Helsinki Olympic Stadium. Thirty-two athletes from 20 nations competed. The maximum number of athletes per nation had been set at 3 since the 1930 Olympic Congress. The event was won by Sim Iness of the United States, the nation's eighth victory in the men's discus throw. Defending champion Adolfo Consolini of Italy took silver, becoming the fourth man to win two medals in the event. American James Dillion won bronze.

Background

This was the 12th appearance of the event, which is one of 12 athletics events to have been held at every Summer Olympics. Eight of the top nine finishers from the 1948 Games returned: gold medalist Adolfo Consolini and silver medalist Giuseppe Tosi of Italy, bronze medalist Fortune Gordien of the United States, fifth-place finisher Ferenc Klics of Hungary, sixth-place finisher Veikko Nyqvist and ninth-place finisher Arvo Huutoniemi of Finland, seventh-place finisher (and 1936 finalist) Nikolaos Syllas of Greece, and eighth-place finisher Stein Johnson of Norway. Consolini, also the 1950 European champion, was favored to repeat. The American team was also strong, as usual, with Gordien holding the world record and Sim Iness winning the U.S. Olympic trials.

Australia, Iceland, Israel, and the Soviet Union each made their debut in the men's discus throw. The United States made its 12th appearance, having competed in every edition of the Olympic men's discus throw to date.

Competition format

The competition used the two-round format introduced in 1936, with the qualifying round completely separate from the divided final. In qualifying, each athlete received three attempts; those recording a mark of at least 46.00 metres advanced to the final. If fewer than 12 athletes achieved that distance, the top 12 would advance. The results of the qualifying round were then ignored. Finalists received three throws each, with the top six competitors receiving an additional three attempts. The best distance among those six throws counted.

Records

Prior to the competition, the existing world and Olympic records were as follows.

The three medalists (Sim Iness, Adolfo Consolini, and James Dillion) all bettered the old Olympic record. Iness was the first to do so, throwing 53.47 metres in the first set of throws in the final. Iness improved on his new record with 54.60 metres in the second set and 55.03 metres in the third.

Schedule

All times are Eastern European Summer Time (UTC+3)

Results

Qualifying round

Qualification: Qualifying Performance 46.00 advance to the final.

Final

References

External links
 Official Olympic Report, la84.org.

Athletics at the 1952 Summer Olympics
Discus throw at the Olympics
Men's events at the 1952 Summer Olympics